Lipová is a village and municipality in the Nové Zámky District in the Nitra Region of south-west Slovakia.

History
In historical records the village was first mentioned in 1156.

Geography
The village lies at an altitude of 126 metres and covers an area of 13.63 km². It has a population of about 1595 people.

Ethnicity
The population is about 97.5% Slovak, 1.5% Romany and 1% Hungarian.

Facilities
The village has a public library and a football pitch.

In literature
Part of Mór Jókai's novel, "A mi lengyelünk" (Our Man from Poland), plays in the Lipová region.

External links
https://web.archive.org/web/20080111223415/http://www.statistics.sk/mosmis/eng/run.html
Lipová – Nové Zámky Okolie

Villages and municipalities in Nové Zámky District